The New Alternatives (Korean: 대안신당) was a South Korean political party founded in 2020.

History 
The New Alternatives was originally organised by the conservative dissidents of the Party for Democracy and Peace (PDP) on 16 July 2019, as the Alternative Political Alliance of Change and Hope (Korean: 변화와 희망의 대안정치연대). It was initially a part of PDP, but then split from PDP on 12 August.

It was refounded as a preparatory committee on 17 November, with the current name. It contains 8 MPs but one of them (Chang Jung-sook) is a PR of Bareunmirae Party who would like to exit. Lee Yong-joo and Chung In-hwa was excluded.

On 12 January 2020, it held the official formation convention and elected Choi Gyung-hwan as its president.

It planned to be the largest party in the 2020 election. However, on 24 February 2020, it was merged into the Minsaeng Party.

Ideology 
The New Alternatives described themselves as the "third position" and is willing to refuse both "fake conservatives" and "fake progressives". Nevertheless, its former chairman, Yu Sung-yup, is economically liberal opposes Keynesian economic policy and minimum wages, and advocates tax reductions. Another member, Lee Yoon-suk, a former MP, opposes same-sex marriage and Islam.

The party adopted the "5 manifestos", which supports:
 the abolition of conscription; change to volunteer military system
 to reform the labour market and put restraints on public spending
 the equal opportunity for all people regardless of birthplace, age, gender, and/or disability
 semi-presidential system
 the abolition of the Ministry of Education; replace it to the National Education Committee

References

2019 establishments in South Korea
2020 disestablishments in South Korea
Christian democratic parties in Asia
Conservative liberal parties
Conservative parties in South Korea
Defunct Christian political parties
Defunct conservative parties
Defunct political parties in South Korea
Liberal parties in South Korea
Political organizations established in 2019
Political parties disestablished in 2020
Political parties established in 2020
Regionalist parties
Social conservative parties
Anti-Islam sentiment in South Korea